Call in may refer to:

Phone-in
'Call-in', (or 'called in'), referring to a planning decision process being passed to a higher authority
In New Zealand, a function available under the Resource Management Act 1991
In the United Kingdom, see Development control in the United Kingdom